Debra J. Saunders is an American syndicated columnist and fellow with the Discovery Institute's Chapman Center for Citizen Leadership.  Her column is syndicated by Creators Syndicate and is carried by newspapers in the United States.
Saunders served as the White House correspondent for the Las Vegas Review-Journal during former President Donald J. Trump's term and in the early weeks of President Joe Biden's administration.

Biography
Saunders graduated in 1980 from the University of Massachusetts at Boston. She majored in Greek and Latin.

In 1992, she became an opinion-page columnist for the San Francisco Chronicle, also syndicated by Creators. She later augmented her thrice-weekly columns with the Token Conservative blog, before leaving the paper in 2016.

Between 1987 and 1992, Saunders was a columnist and editorial writer for the Los Angeles Daily News. She previously worked for conservative advocacy groups and for a Republican leader of the California State Assembly.

In addition to her columns, Saunders has written for The Wall Street Journal and The Weekly Standard". She is the author of one book, The World According to Gore.

Saunders is married to Wesley J. Smith.

Views

In 2006, Saunders wrote articles opposing the War on Drugs.Your Tax dollars on Drugs Debra Saunders, Feb. 12, 2006 She campaigned in her column for President Bush to issue more pardons and sentence commutations.

Saunders voted against Proposition 22 in 2000. In 2004, Saunders wrote in support of same-sex marriage. She was critical of the California Supreme Court decision that legalized same-sex marriage.

In 2007, she wrote an article that criticized the imprisoned freelance journalist Josh Wolf, although she opposed his imprisonment.

In 2007 Saunders described herself as a climate change skeptic.

In 2011, she wrote about the comic character Foreskin Man'', which was being used to promote a ballot initiative to ban circumcision in San Francisco.

References

External links
Token Conservative
Podcasts of Saunders' recent articles
Debra Saunders speaks against clemency for Stanley Tookie Williams

1954 births
Living people
American columnists
National Review people
University of Massachusetts Boston alumni